Stephen Stucker (July 2, 1947 – April 13, 1986) was an American actor, known for portrayals of bizarre, larger-than-life characters, notably the manic control-room worker Johnny in the early 1980s Airplane! movies and the crossdressing, rubber-penis-waving stenographer in the courtroom sequence of 1977's The Kentucky Fried Movie.

Early life and career
Stucker was born in Des Moines, Iowa. His family moved to Shaker Heights, Ohio, where he distinguished himself in school as a pianist and class clown.

He made his screen debut co-starring in the 1975 comedic sexploitation film Carnal Madness as Bruce Wilson, a gay fashion designer who escapes from an insane asylum with two fellow inmates, fleeing to an all-girls school. He went on to perform in the 1977 earthquake-in-Los-Angeles comedy Cracking Up, with Fred Willard, Michael McKean and Harry Shearer.

Stucker was a scene-stealing member of the cast of the Madison, Wisconsin Kentucky Fried Theater sketch comedy troupe founded by David Zucker, Jim Abrahams and Jerry Zucker.  In 1977 he appeared in the John Landis film The Kentucky Fried Movie, based on the troupe's sketches. It led to his supporting role in the Zucker-Abrahams-Zucker comedy Airplane!, which he reprised in Airplane II: The Sequel. For the first film, the writers gave Stucker the straight lines for his scenes and let him write his character's off-the-wall responses.

In 1982 he had a guest role in a three-episode sequence in the TV series Mork & Mindy and, in 1983, had a small featured role in Landis' Trading Places. In 1984, he had a co-starring role as the sex-obsessed psychiatrist Dr. Bender in the teen comedy film Bad Manners (aka: Growing Pains).

Illness and death
On July 12, 1984, Stucker was diagnosed with AIDS. He later publicly announced his illness the following year, making him one of the first actors to announce he was suffering from the disease. He had apparently suffered from cancer-related symptoms as early as 1979, prior to public knowledge of what AIDS was. In addition to having many short-term homosexual relationships, he claimed in a November 1985 interview that he was a former drug user who used needles, and had received blood transfusions.

He died from AIDS-related complications in a Los Angeles hospital on April 13, 1986 at the age of 38. He is interred in the Chapel of the Chimes.

Filmography

References

External links
 
 

1947 births
1986 deaths
20th-century American male actors
AIDS-related deaths in California
American male film actors
American male television actors
Male actors from Des Moines, Iowa
Actors from Shaker Heights, Ohio
American gay actors
LGBT people from Ohio
20th-century American LGBT people